Elm Creek is a stream in Morris County, Kansas, in the United States. It is a tributary of the Neosho River.

Elm Creek was named for the elm trees lining its banks.

See also
List of rivers of Kansas

References

Rivers of Morris County, Kansas
Rivers of Kansas